Helcogramma ellioti, known commonly as the red-eye threefin, is a species of triplefin blenny in the genus Helcogramma. It was described by Albert William Herre in 1944 who honoured the Scottish naturalist and ethnologist Walter Elliot (1803-1897) in its specific name. This species occurs in the Indian Ocean along the eastern and western coasts of India and around Sri Lanka.

References

Red-eye triplefin
Taxa named by Albert William Herre
Fish described in 1944